Mokrishte is a village in Pazardzhik Municipality, Pazardzhik Province, southern Bulgaria.  the population is 2,090. It located at an altitude of 210 m, at 2,5 km to the south west of Pazardzhik and at 0,1 km of the railway-stop/station Sofia-Plovdiv.

Agriculture is efficient and productive with large areas covered with orchards (apples and pears) and vegetables. Livestock breeding is also well developed (sheep). There is a school and chitalishte.

Villages in Pazardzhik Province